Nicolas-Christophe Grimal (born 13 November 1948 in Libourne) is a French Egyptologist.

Biography 
Nicolas Grimal was born to Pierre Grimal in 1948. After his Agrégation in Classics in 1971, he obtained a PhD in 1976 and a Doctorat d'État in 1984. He has been a professor at the Sorbonne from 1988 to 2000.

From 1989 to 1999, he headed the French Institute of Oriental Archeology in Cairo. Since 1990, he has been the scientific director of the Franco-Egyptian Centre for study of the temples of Karnak. He has held the chair of Egyptology at the Collège de France since 2000.

Honours 
 Prix Grimal le Petit, personnalité de l'année (2022) 
 Prix Gaston Maspero (1987)
 Prix Diane Potier-Boes (1989)
 Commander of the Palmes académiques
 Officer of the ordre national du Mérite
 Knight of the Légion d'honneur
 Member of the Académie des inscriptions et belles-lettres (2006).
 Member of the Académie des sciences d'outre-mer (2016).
 Foreign Associate of the Deutsches archäologisches Instituts, Berlin (1995).
 Member of the Institut d'Égypte (1994).
 Foreign Associate of the Akademie der Wissenschaften, Wien (2007).

Works 
 Histoire de l'Égypte ancienne, Fayard, Paris, 1988,  (English: A History of Ancient Egypt, Blackwell, 1992)
 Leçon inaugurale, faite le mardi 10 mars 2000, Collège de France, Chaire de civilisation pharaonique, archéologie, philologie, histoire, Collège de France, Paris, 2000
 Leçon inaugurale, faite le mardi 24 octobre 2000, Collège de France, Paris, 2000.

References

French Egyptologists
1948 births
Living people
People from Libourne
Academic staff of the Collège de France
Members of the Académie des Inscriptions et Belles-Lettres
Members of the Institut Français d'Archéologie Orientale
Chevaliers of the Légion d'honneur
Officiers of the Ordre des Palmes Académiques
Officers of the Ordre national du Mérite